Mthokozisi Yende (born 7 June 1984 in Tembisa) is a retired South African professional footballer, who played for Maritzburg United in the Premier Soccer League, and Kaizer Chiefs. He started his professional career at Benoni Premier United and has also played for Tembisa Classic, University of Pretoria before moving to Kaizer Chiefs for an undisclosed fee in July 2009.

Career

Early career 
Yende started out at his hometown club Tembisa Classic, before moving to University of Pretoria in National First Division in 2006.

Kaizer Chiefs 
On 1 July 2009 he moved to Kaizer Chiefs in the Premier Soccer League, the top division in South Africa. He moved for an Undisclosed fee, and was mainly a fringe player but towards the end of the 2009–10 season he got his chance to impress. He scored his first goal for the club in aleague match away to SuperSport United.

Career statistics

Statistics accurate as of match played 26 October 2010

References

External links
 Profile at KaizerChiefs.com
 Player Profile at MTNFootball.com

1984 births
Living people
People from Tembisa
Sportspeople from Gauteng
Sportspeople from Johannesburg
South African soccer players
Association football midfielders
Kaizer Chiefs F.C. players
University of Pretoria F.C. players
Maritzburg United F.C. players
Free State Stars F.C. players
Moroka Swallows F.C. players